Arish Alam (born 19 November 1986) is an Indian cricketer, who played first-class cricket for Uttar Pradesh. He was a batsman, and off break bowler.

Career
In 2004, Alam represented the Central team in the Hemu Adhikari Memorial inter-Academy cricket tournament. He made his first-class debut for Uttar Pradesh against Haryana in a 2005/06 Ranji Trophy match; Alam scored 19 and 13. In 2011, he represented Unity Cricket Club in the SS Hussain Memorial State Cricket Tournament match; in the final against Lucknow Cricket Academy, Alam scored 63, and took 3/27. Alam was also awarded the "Man of the Series" award for the tournament. In the 2012–13 Ranji Trophy, Alam scored centuries in matches for Uttar Pradesh against Baroda and Vidarbha.

References

External links

Living people
1986 births
Indian cricketers
Uttar Pradesh cricketers
People from Jalaun